William John Gruffydd (14 February 1881 – 29 September 1954) was a Welsh scholar, poet, writer and editor, and the last Member of Parliament to represent the University of Wales seat.

Family, education and early life
Gruffydd was born in Gorffwysfa, Bethel, in the parish of Llanddeiniolen, Caernarfonshire, the son of a quarryman.

In 1894, after elementary schooling at Bethel primary school, he was one of the first students to join the recently opened Caernarvon County School. In 1899, he won a place at Jesus College, Oxford, graduating in English literature.

In 1904 he was appointed Assistant Master at Beaumaris Grammar School, and in 1906 Lecturer in Celtic at University College, Cardiff (now Cardiff University).

In 1909 he married Gwenda Evans, the daughter of a minister of religion from Abercarn. They had one son.

During the First World War he volunteered for service with the Royal Navy: he served from 1915 to 1918 as a naval officer in the North Sea and the Mediterranean.

On being demobilised, he was appointed Professor of Celtic at University College, Cardiff (succeeding Professor Thomas Powel, who retired in 1918), and he held the chair until his retirement in 1946.

Celticist and poet
Gruffydd specialised in Celtic culture. He became a schoolteacher and worked in Scarborough and then for two years at Beaumaris Grammar School before taking a post as assistant lecturer in Celtic studies at University College, Cardiff, in 1906; from 1918 until 1946 he was Professor of Celtic. He was President of Council of the National Eisteddfod of Wales and edited Y Llenor ('The Littérateur', a highly influential Welsh-language journal of literature published by the university). He wrote poetry and prose and contributed to Welsh scholarship by publishing important histories of Welsh literature and legend.

Politics
Coming from a nonconformist, radical family, Gruffydd took an interest in Welsh politics and social questions. He was a member of Plaid Cymru and served as deputy vice-president in 1937. However, Gruffydd voiced disagreement with the party president Saunders Lewis, which eventually led to his leaving the party.

Gruffydd was elected to Parliament as a Liberal Member of Parliament (MP) for the University of Wales seat in a by-election on 29 January 1943 after the sitting MP Ernest Evans became a County Court Judge. Gruffydd's opponent in the by-election was Plaid Cymru's Saunders Lewis, and he had effectively split the Welsh-speaking community. He was comfortably re-elected in the 1945 general election and sat until the abolition of university seats in 1950. He did not stand again for Parliament.

Historians' judgment
The 1945 general election brought a reduction in Liberal strength in the House of Commons and was particularly savage for its leadership. Sir Archibald Sinclair, the party leader, lost his seat in Caithness and Sutherland, the Chief Whip Sir Percy Harris and William Beveridge were also beaten. In fact, with the exception of Gwilym Lloyd-George (who was in any case travelling in the direction of the Conservatives) every Liberal MP who had ever held government office was defeated. This meant that a new leader was required. Gruffydd was not a candidate and historians have noted that he was more concerned with his academic work than with trying to make a career in politics, but the judgment of one historian of the Liberal Party that he was an academic of extremely limited political experience only sitting in the House because of the university seats seems unduly harsh in the light of Gruffydd's long-time association with Welsh political and social affairs his previous vice-presidency of Plaid Cymru and his managing to be returned to the House of Commons when so many others were falling by the wayside; even candidates for university seats had to win the votes of real voters.

Death
Gruffydd died at his home in Bangor Road, Caernarfon, on 29 September 1954. He was buried in the cemetery at Llanddeiniolen near the yew tree about which he composed one of his most famous poems.

References

Sources

Books and journals

C. W. Lewis and Clare L. Taylor, 'William John Gruffydd' in the Dictionary of National Biography, OUP 2004–2008
Who was Who, OUP 2007

Papers
Papers of W. J. Gruffydd, [1903]–[1952], including drafts of articles relating to the Mabinogi; lecture notes for his Welsh courses at University College of Wales, Cardiff; other lecture notes and articles; BBC broadcast talks; personalia; and a substantial group of correspondence from notable literary figures are deposited in the National Library of Wales, Aberystwyth.

External links

 

1881 births
1954 deaths
Alumni of Jesus College, Oxford
Academics of Cardiff University
Crowned bards
Welsh-language writers
20th-century Welsh writers
Welsh scholars and academics
Liberal Party (UK) MPs for Welsh constituencies
Members of the Parliament of the United Kingdom for the University of Wales
UK MPs 1935–1945
UK MPs 1945–1950
Royal Naval Volunteer Reserve personnel of World War I
20th-century Welsh poets
Celtic studies scholars